Get Scraped is the debut studio album by Canadian electronic music producer Deadmau5, released on July 26, 2005, by the independent record label Zoolook.

Background 
The track title "Bored of Canada" presumably refers to Boards of Canada, a Scottish downtempo and IDM act whom Zimmerman has pointed to as one of his influences. The track itself is a short, interlude-like track that is reminiscent of the Boards of Canada signature. The track is followed by nearly one minute of silence, and then a few seconds of the track repeating from the beginning again. This is believed to be an error, since a version without the silence can be found on other releases such as Project 56.
 
The track "Intelstat" contains vocal samples of the song "M01 Chant I – Making of Cyborg" by Kenji Kawai from the Ghost in the Shell soundtrack.

Release 
The album has a 2005 demo CD release, which Zimmerman claimed to have been limited to "about 100 copies". Several copies of the demo have since been rediscovered by fans. A revised digital download was released on June 12, 2006. Two tracks "FlashTV" and "Messages from Nowhere" were omitted from the digital release. However they were digitally re-released in 2006 by Nicholas Da Silva, the owner of Zoolook Records on his since removed album Hitless. In March 2017, Zimmerman himself re-released "Messages from Nowhere" on his compilation album Stuff I Used to Do, which also included the tracks "Sometimes I Fail", "Support", "Try Again" and "Unspecial Effects" from the album as well.

In 2018, the digital download version of Get Scraped was removed from all major streaming and digital download services for unknown reasons, making the album unavailable to listen to in full.

Reception 
Due to the fact that Zimmerman was unknown outside of the Internet at the time, there are no reviews that date near the album's initial release. However, as Zimmerman gained popularity during the late 2000s, online articles looking back on the album's release have emerged.

Track listing

Digital download

CD

References

External links 
 Get Scraped at Discogs
 Allmusic entry

Deadmau5 albums
2005 debut albums